= John Lyon (antiquary) =

Irish antiquarian

- Born: 1702
- Died: 1790 (aged 87–88)
- Occupation: Antiquarian

John Lyon (1702–1790) was an Irish antiquarian.

== Biography ==
Lyon was born in 1702. He was elected scholar of Trinity College, Dublin, in 1727, graduated B.A. in 1729, M.A. in 1732, and accumulated his degrees in divinity on 22 Oct. 1751 (Dublin Graduates, as ‘Lyons’). On 2 Aug. 1740 he became minor canon of St. Patrick's, Dublin (Cotton, Fasti, ii. 199). He was made prebendary of Rathmichael in the same cathedral on 12 April 1751 (ib. ii. 172), of Ta-sagart on 15 Nov. 1771 (ib. ii. 163), and of Malahidert on 23 June 1787 (ib. ii. 155). In 1764, he was elected curate of St. Bride, Dublin, and subsequently obtained the rectory of Killeshill, co. Tyrone (Nichols, Illustr. of Lit. vii. 778). He was buried in St. Patrick's Cathedral on 12 June 1790; his wife was buried there on 24 Feb. 1790.

Lyon, although he never published anything, was reputed a learned ecclesiologist. ‘There is no one,’ says Monck Mason, ‘to whom the Irish antiquarian is more indebted; to his diligence we chiefly owe the preservation of whatever remains of the ecclesiastical antiquities of Dublin.’ For several years he was engaged, under the auspices of Swift, in investigating the antiquities of St. Patrick's, and received several grants of money for the prosecution of his researches. Swift in his last illness was confided to Lyon's care. Some manuscripts of Swift which remained in his hands were communicated to Sir Walter Scott by his nephew, Thomas Steele (ib. v. 397). He also left valuable manuscript remarks upon Hawkesworth's ‘Life of Swift,’ which have proved of the greatest use to succeeding biographers.
